is a town located in Nagano Prefecture, Japan. , the town had an estimated population of 8,339 in 3351 households, and a population density of 56 persons per km².

History
The area of present-day Shinano was part of ancient Shinano Province. The modern village of Shinano was created by the merger of the villages of Kashiwabara and Fujisato on July 1, 1955. Shinano merged with the neighboring villages of Furuma and Shinanojiri to form the town of Shinano on September 30, 1956.

Geography
Shinano is located in far northern Nagano Prefecture, bordered by Niigata Prefecture to the north. Lake Nojiri and Mount Kurohime are in Shinano.

Surrounding municipalities
Nagano Prefecture
 Iiyama
 Nagano
 Iizuna
Niigata Prefecture
 Myōkō

Climate
The town has a  humid continental climate characterized by characterized by short, hot and humid summers, and cold winters with heavy snowfall (Köppen climate classification Cfa).

Demographics
Per Japanese census data, the population of Shinano has declined over the past 70 years.

Education
Shinano has one combined public elementary/middle school operated by the town government. The town does not have a high school.

Transportation

Railway
  Shinano Railway - Kita-Shinano Line
 -

Highway
 Jōshin-etsu Expressway

Local attractions
Lake Nojiri
Naena Falls, one of the 100 Waterfalls of Japan
Lake Nojiri Naumann Elephant Museum

Notable people from Shinano
Kobayashi Issa, poet

Administrators 
Mayors

 1st generation- Shigeichiro Matsuki (October 1956-4th quarter of November 1970)
 2nd generation- Kazuo Kobayashi (Nov. 1970-Nov. 4, 1986)
 3rd generation- Akio Takeuchi (November 1986-November 1, 1990)
 4th generation- Tadakazu Ogusa (Nov. 1990-Nov. 3, 2002)
 5th generation- Hiroshi Hattori (November 2002-November 1, 2006)
 6th generation- Shigehiro Matsuki (Nov. 2006-Nov. 2, 2014)
 7th generation- Masatomo Yokokawa (November 2014 – present)

Town council 

 Number of lawmakers: 12 (term of office: until March 31, 2021) 
 Chair: Moriyama Konomi 
 Since January 2013, it has adopted the “Full Year Assembly”

References

External links

Official Website 

 
Towns in Nagano Prefecture